Keith Gradwell (born 23 March 1952) is a South African former cricketer. He played in thirty first-class and four List A matches for Eastern Province from 1977/78 to 1991/92.

See also
 List of Eastern Province representative cricketers

References

External links
 

1952 births
Living people
South African cricketers
Eastern Province cricketers
People from Makhanda, Eastern Cape
Cricketers from the Eastern Cape